Antonio Barrios Seoane (21 May 1910 – 19 August 2002) was a Spanish professional football player and coach. He managed a number of club sides including Real Valladolid, Racing de Santander, Athletic Bilbao, Atlético Madrid, Real Betis, Espanyol, Elche, Real Sociedad, Sevilla and Recreativo de Huelva.

He also played for clubs including Arenas de Getxo and Real Valladolid.

References

External links
 

1910 births
2002 deaths
Footballers from Getxo
Spanish footballers
Association football forwards
Arenas Club de Getxo footballers
Real Valladolid players
Spanish football managers
Sevilla FC managers
Atlético Madrid managers
Real Betis managers
Athletic Bilbao managers
Real Valladolid managers
Racing de Santander managers
RCD Espanyol managers
Elche CF managers
Real Sociedad managers
Recreativo de Huelva managers
CD Málaga managers
CA Osasuna managers
Moghreb Tétouan managers
La Liga players
Segunda División players
La Liga managers